is an action-adventure video game developed by Nexa and released by Sega for the Master System in 1989. It is based on the American television series ALF. Players control the title character as he attempts to locate parts with which to repair his spaceship, so he can meet up with his friends Skip and Rhonda on the planet Mars.

The game is the only home console game based on the ALF television show. Other ALF games have been released for various computer systems, including ALF: The First Adventure, the first ALF game. A couple of edutainment games based on the character were also released in later years: ALF's US Geography and ALF's Thinking Skills.

Gameplay
The player controls ALF, who must collect the necessary items and solve puzzles to repair ALF's spaceship.

The game features several locations through which players can roam freely: ALF's house, street, basement of the house, ALF's backyard and a pond in the backyard. The player must collect various objects to progress in the game: a stick of salami, which can be used to deal with the bats, scuba gear, allowing him to plunge to the bottom of the pond, and other objects. Items can be found as the game progresses and can also be purchased through the in-game store.

Some enemies in the game can be defeated, while others must be dodged, such as bats and street cyclists.

Development
The game was a side project for Kevin Seghetti, who at the time was under the employment for Nexa, then integrated with Spectrum Holobyte, who in turn changed their name to Sphere. Although Seghetti was not a fan of the ALF TV Show, he worked heavily on the game's engine. The quality of the code he wrote was an improvement over the Master System version of Monopoly. The artwork was done in Deluxe Paint and converted via a Commodore Amiga to become transferable character and map files.

In the later stages of development, ALF was lacking audio and the producer John Sauer did not have adequate game design experience. With only a maximum budget of $200, Sauer managed to find Randy Roseberry to compose the music and sound. With weeks of revision and cleaning up the game's code, the game was shipped by the end of 1989, overruling Sauer's objection due to the crude quality of the product.

References

External links

1989 video games
Master System games
Master System-only games
North America-exclusive video games
Sega games
Single-player video games
Video games based on ALF (TV series)
Video games developed in the United States
Video games set in the 1980s